LaMarcus Darnell Coker  (born June 26, 1986) is a former football running back who played for the Calgary Stampeders of the Canadian Football League.

College
LaMarcus Coker enjoyed a successful college football career as a running back at the University of Tennessee and later, at Hampton University. Coker was named a starting running back at Tennessee near the end of the 2006 season. Coker scored a touchdown on his first college reception, a trick play pass from Lucas Taylor. In addition to being a multi-purpose threat out of the backfield, Coker excelled as a kick returner and special teams gunner.

Following the 2006 season, Coker was named to The Sporting News Freshman All SEC team and first team Freshman All American.  He ended the season with 696 yards on 108 carries and scored 6 total touchdowns, while leading the Vols in rushing.

Coker was a starter over Arian Foster in the 2007 season before The University of Tennessee cut Coker for violating their drug policy.

From 2008-2009, Coker was the featured back in Hampton University's spread offense. In 2009, Coker lead the MEAC in rushing yards with 1,027 yards at season's end, and finished second in all- purpose yards with 1,537 yards. Coker was named first team All-MEAC, and was selected to play in the 8th annual East Coast Bowl and the HBCU Bowl.

In the East Coast Bowl, Coker rushed twelve times for 204 yards and three touchdowns and was named the most valuable player of the game. At the East Coast Bowl combine, Coker ran a 4.27 40 yard dash in front of NFL scouts.

In the HBCU Bowl, Coker led all players with 3 reception and 82 yards, despite playing with an injured finger.

Coker trained at Perfect Competition in Davie, Florida, in preparation for his Pro Day workout. It has been reported that Coker ran a 4.26 electronic timed forty yard dash on 02/16/10.

On March 17, 2010, Coker participated in the William & Mary Pro Day.

High school

Coker was all-state in football and track at Antioch High in Antioch, Tennessee. Coker was named the 5A Back of the year following his senior season.  Coker concentrated on sprints for the track team, winning the state title in the 200 meter dash as a sophomore and the 100 meter dash as a junior.

Professional career

After playing for the Nashville Storm, a local adult amateur team, Coker was signed to the practice roster of the Calgary Stampeders of the Canadian Football League in May 2011. On June 22, 2013 Coker was released by the Calgary Stampeders.

External links
 Tennessee Volunteers bio
 Calgary Stampeders bio

References

1986 births
American football running backs
Hampton Pirates football players
Living people
Tennessee Volunteers football players
People from Antioch, Tennessee